Phạm Hải Yến (born 9 November 1994) is a Vietnamese footballer who plays as a forward for Hanoi I FC and the Vietnam women's national team.

International goals
.Scores and results are list Vietnam's goal tally first

References

1994 births
Living people
Women's association football forwards
Vietnamese women's footballers
Vietnam women's international footballers
Asian Games competitors for Vietnam
Footballers at the 2014 Asian Games
Footballers at the 2018 Asian Games
Southeast Asian Games gold medalists for Vietnam
Southeast Asian Games medalists in football
Competitors at the 2017 Southeast Asian Games
21st-century Vietnamese women